The Spy is an Isaac Bell adventure tale, the third in that series.  The hardcover edition was released June 1, 2010.  Other editions were released on different dates.

Plot
This novel is set in 1908, as international tensions are rising and moving the world toward war.  A notable American battleship gun designer dies in what is thought a sensational suicide, but his daughter has no doubt he was murdered.  She turns to the legendary Van Dorn Detective Agency to investigate and clear her father's name.  Owner Joseph Van Dorn assigns his chief investigator, Isaac Bell, to the case.  Bell quickly realizes the designer appeared to have been murdered.  More suspicious deaths among engineers involved in the design of a new American dreadnought battleship follow.  Even Van Dorn agents, including Bell, are attacked and Bell realizes an elusive spy is orchestrating all the havoc.  In this story, Bell becomes pitted against British, German and Japanese spies.  His quest to get to the bottom of the intrigue leads him to find his elusive spy leading his mission of sabotage and murder right under his nose.

Reception
The Spy reached the USA Today best-selling book list on June 10, 2010, and remained on the list for twelve weeks, at one point reaching number sixteen on the list. The Book Reporter website said in early 2011, "The ship-shape writing duo heaps on more excitement and thrills than a Coney Island roller coaster ride." The Citizen, a Key West, Florida, daily newspaper said of The Spy, "Clive Cussler and Justin Scott have succeeded in writing another page-turning historical thriller filled with suspense and great period detail."

References

2010 American novels
Fiction set in 1908
G. P. Putnam's Sons books
Collaborative novels
Michael Joseph books